Travis Andrew Steele (born November 12, 1981) is an American college basketball coach, and current head basketball coach at Miami University (OH). He recently served as the head coach at Xavier.

Coaching career
Steele began coaching as an undergraduate at Butler University, assisting the varsity boys basketball team at nearby Ben Davis HS from 2001 to 2004. He served one season as a graduate manager at Ohio State before landing his first college coaching position as an assistant coach at Wabash Valley in 2005. Steele moved on to Indiana, where he started as the team's video coordinator in 2006, and was elevated to an assistant coach for the remainder of the 2008 season after Kelvin Sampson's contract was terminated by the Hoosiers as a result of NCAA recruiting violations.

After Indiana, Steele was hired by Sean Miller at Xavier for the 2008-09 season. Steele was retained by Chris Mack after Miller accepted the Arizona head coaching position, and has been a part of a Musketeers program that has been to eight NCAA tournaments, including an Elite Eight run in 2017, as well as being part of two Atlantic 10 regular season titles, and one Big East regular season title.

Xavier
On March 31, 2018, Steele was promoted to head coach to become the 18th head coach in Xavier history, replacing Mack who departed for Louisville. Steele led the Musketeers to the 2019 NIT in his first season on the job, and another appearance in the tournament in 2022. On March 16, 2022, the day after Xavier's first-round NIT win over Cleveland State, Steele was fired from Xavier. He would complete his four-year tenure as head coach with a 70–50 overall record.

Miami (OH)
On March 31, 2022 Steele was hired as the new head coach at Miami, becoming the 28th head coach in school history.

Head coaching record

 ^a Steele was fired after the NIT First Round win over Cleveland State.

Personal life
Steele's brother is John Groce, the current head coach of Akron.

References

1983 births
Living people
American men's basketball coaches
Basketball coaches from Indiana
Butler University alumni
College men's basketball head coaches in the United States
High school basketball coaches in Indiana
Indiana Hoosiers men's basketball coaches
People from Danville, Indiana
Wabash Valley Warriors men's basketball coaches
Xavier Musketeers men's basketball coaches
Miami RedHawks men's basketball coaches